Merry Christmas is a 2013 studio album by the Leningrad Cowboys. Released exclusively in December 2013 in a box set with their book PRAVDA - The Truth About the Leningrad Cowboys, a Finnish chocolate bar, postcard, and pin.  It will be available on its own in 2014.

Track listing

References

2013 Christmas albums
Leningrad Cowboys albums
Rock Christmas albums
Covers albums